Gene Ormsby is a former English rugby league footballer who most recently played for the Barrow Raiders in the Betfred Championship. His position is wing.

Ormsby joined Warrington at the age of 16 from amateur side Oldham St Annes ARLFC. After spending time as a dual registered player at Swinton, he made his Super League début in February 2014 against Leeds. Ormsby enjoyed a successful opening season with the Wolves, scoring 12 tries in his opening season. He scored his first career hat trick against the Salford in June 2015 in a 34-18 win.. He has also had a loan spell at Oldham RLFC (Heritage № 1377).

In 2016, he was called up to the initial Ireland squad for the 2017 Rugby League World Cup European Pool B qualifiers.; however, he did not make the cut for the final 22-man squad.

References

External links
Huddersfield Giants profile
Profile at warringtonwolves.com
Statistics at rugby-league.com

1992 births
Living people
Barrow Raiders players
English people of Irish descent
English rugby league players
Huddersfield Giants players
North Wales Crusaders players
Oldham R.L.F.C. players
Rugby league players from Oldham
Rugby league wingers
Swinton Lions players
Warrington Wolves players